The women's 5000 metres walk event at the 1986 World Junior Championships in Athletics was held in Athens, Greece, at Olympic Stadium on 20 July.

Medalists

Results

Final
20 July

Participation
According to an unofficial count, 24 athletes from 16 countries participated in the event.

References

5000 metres walk
Racewalking at the World Athletics U20 Championships